The 1972 Stanford Cardinals football team represented Stanford University in the 1972 NCAA University Division football season. Following the departure of head coach John Ralston for the Denver Broncos in early January, defensive backs coach Jack Christiansen was promoted to head coach.
Stanford finished at 6–5, but were 2–5 in Pacific-8 Conference play, tied for sixth.

The school changed its nickname from "Indians" to "Cardinals" in March after objections from Native American students and a vote by the student senate.

Schedule

Personnel

Game summaries

Washington

California

References

External links
 Game program: Stanford at Washington State – November 11, 1972

Stanford
Stanford Cardinal football seasons
Stanford Cardinals football